A list of notable Polish politicians and members of the defunct Polish Workers' Party.

B
 Jerzy Borejsza

H
 Tadeusz Hołuj

J
 Mieczysław Jagielski
 Piotr Jaroszewicz
 Wojciech Jaruzelski
 Stefan Jędrychowski

K
 Stanisław Kania
 Czesław Kiszczak
 Zenon Kliszko
 Władysław Kowalski
 Leon Kruczkowski

L
 Józef Lewartowski

M
 Władysław Machejek
 Stefan Michnik
 Kazimierz Mijal
 Mieczysław Moczar
 Zygmunt Modzelewski

N
 Zenon Nowak

O
 Edward Ochab

P
 Julian Przyboś
 Janusz Przymanowski

R
 Michał Rola-Żymierski
 Józef Różański

S
 Leon Schiller
 Florian Siwicki
 Włodzimierz Sokorski
 Stefan Staszewski

Z
 Jerzy Ziętek

Ś
 Karol Świerczewski

 
Workers Party